Siege of Aleppo or Battle of Aleppo may refer to: 
 Siege of Aleppo (637), during the Arab–Byzantine wars
 Sack of Aleppo (962), during the Arab–Byzantine wars by general Nikephoros Phokas
 Siege of Aleppo (969), during the Arab–Byzantine wars by general Peter
 Siege of Aleppo (977) by Sa'd al-Dawla
 Siege of Aleppo (983) by Bakjur and the Fatimid Caliphate
 Siege of Aleppo (994–995) by the Fatimid Caliphate
 Siege of Aleppo (1024–1025) by Salih ibn Mirdas
 Siege of Aleppo (1071) by Alp Arslan
 Siege of Aleppo (1124–1125), during Baldwin II's reign of Jerusalem
 Siege of Aleppo (1138), by a joint Byzantine-Crusader force under John II Komnenos
 Siege of Aleppo (1174–1175), by Saladin
 Siege of Aleppo (1260), during the Mongol invasion of Syria led by Hulagu Khan
 Siege of Aleppo (1280), during the Mongol invasion of Syria led by Abaqa Khan
 Siege of Aleppo (1400), during Timur's conquest of Syria
 Massacre of Aleppo (1850), a massacre committed by Muslim rioters against Christians and the bombardment by Ottoman forces on the rioters.
 Battle of Aleppo (1918), during World War I
 Siege of Aleppo (1980), during the Islamic uprising in Syria
 Battle of Aleppo (2012–2016), during the Syrian Civil War